The Latest Fashion is the second studio album from Welsh alternative rock band Attack! Attack!. The album was released on 27 September 2010 and features the singles "Not Afraid", "We're Not the Enemy" and "Blood on My Hands" . The band released the track "No Excuses" as a free download from the Hassle Records website. As of 25 September 2010, the whole album was uploaded to the band's MySpace. Attack! Attack!'s Neil Starr revealed on his Twitter that he is already making songs for the follow-up to The Latest Fashion. On 26 January it was revealed Attack! Attack! was receiving a lot of airtime in Australian radio stations, then 3 days later on 29 January, A! A! announced the album would be released in Australia on 11 February through Hassle Records.

Track listing

Attack! Attack! UK went on a World tour kicking off in The UK and going to countries such as France & Belgium.
They Played a set of songs which features From the self-titled and The Latest fashion. They then announced dates early 2011 to play at venues and cities they don't normally play.

Personnel
 Neil Starr – lead vocals, guitar
 Ryan Day – guitar, vocals
 Will Davies – bass
 Mike Griffiths – drums

2010 albums
Hassle Records albums
Attack! Attack! albums